NA-28 Peshawar-I is a constituency that elects one member to the National Assembly of Pakistan.

Area
During the delimitation of 2018, NA-27 (Peshawar-I) acquired areas from NA-2 (Peshawar-II) and NA-3 (Peshawar-III), the areas of Peshawar which are part of this constituency are listed below alongside the former constituency name from which they were acquired:

Areas acquired from NA-2 (Peshawar-II)
Palusi Attuzai
Palusi Maqdarzai
Palusi Talarzai

Areas acquired from NA-3 (Peshawar-III)
Eid Gah Colony
Hassan Garhi
Tableeghi Markaz
Darmagi
Irrigation Colony Warsak Road
Mathra (excluding Reggi Lalma and Reggi Ufatazai)
Mahal Salu
Bunyadi
Isa Khel Hamid
Laram
Babu Zai
Khazana
Haryana Payan

Members of Parliament

1970–1977: NW-3 Peshawar-III

1977–2002: NA-3 Peshawar-III

2002–2018: NA-3 Peshawar-III

2018-2022: NA-27 Peshawar-I

Elections since 2002

2002 general election

A total of 1,955 votes were rejected.

2008 general election

A total of 2,566 votes were rejected.

2013 general election

A total of 5,276 votes were rejected.

2018 general election 

General elections were held on 25 July 2018.

See also
NA-27 Khyber
NA-29 Peshawar-II

References

External links 
 Election result's official website

27
27